

Piezoelectric resonator (disambiguation) 
A piezoelectric resonator is an electronic component designed for electronic oscillators and filters.

Piezoelectric resonators are: 

 crystal resonators, see Crystal oscillator
 polycrystalline resonators, see Ceramic resonator
 MEMS oscillators

See also

 Clock generator
 Electronic oscillator